The men's high jump at the 1958 European Athletics Championships was held in Stockholm, Sweden, at Stockholms Olympiastadion on 23 and 24 August 1958.

Medalists

Results

Qualification
23 August

Final
24 August

Participation
According to an unofficial count, 18 athletes from 12 countries participated in the event.

 (2)
 (1)
 (2)
 (1)
 (2)
 (2)
 (2)
 (1)
 (1)
 (2)
 (1)
 (1)

References

High jump
High jump at the European Athletics Championships